Constitutional Council might refer to:

 Constitutional Council (Chad)
 Constitutional Council (France)
 Constitutional Council (Ivory Coast)
 Constitutional Council (Sri Lanka)
 Constitutional Council (Cambodia)
 Constitutional Council (Kazakhstan)
 Constitutional Council (Lebanon)

See also 
 Constitutional court